Radio Gold is a radio channel of All India Radio. It is aired in Delhi, Mumbai, Indore, Kolkata, and Chennai. 

The 106.4 FM Radio Gold also started its transmission in other centres of Tamil Nadu like Coimbatore, Tuticorin and more recently, in Puducherry.

References

External links
Official Website, AllIndiaRadio.org 

All India Radio
Radio stations in Mumbai
Radio stations in Indore
Radio stations in Bhopal
Radio stations in Kolkata
Radio stations in Chennai
Radio stations in Delhi
Radio stations in Puducherry
Radio stations in Coimbatore
Radio stations in Tiruchirappalli
Music of Bengal